Raúl Bertelsen Repetto (born 18 March 1945) is a Chilean lawyer and president of the Constitutional Court of Chile.

References

1945 births
Living people
Chilean people of Italian descent
21st-century Chilean lawyers
Pontifical Catholic University of Valparaíso alumni
University of Navarra alumni
20th-century Chilean lawyers